Casselman may refer to:

Places
 Casselman, Pennsylvania, a borough in Somerset County, Pennsylvania
 Casselman, Ontario,  a village in eastern Ontario
 Casselman-Steele Heights, Edmonton, a residential area located in northeast Edmonton, Alberta, Canada.
 Casselman, Edmonton, a residential neighbourhood located in northeast Edmonton, Alberta, Canada.
 Casselman River, a tributary of the Youghiogheny River in Pennsylvania
 Casselman Formation, a sedimentary bedrock unit in Pennsylvania and Maryland

People
 Amos Casselman  (1850-1929), an American archer
 Arthur Allen Casselman (1902-1974), a Canadian politician
 Arza Clair Casselman (1891-1958), an Ontario lawyer and political figure
 Cora Taylor Casselman (1888-1964), a Canadian federal politician
 Frederick Clayton Casselman  (1885-1941), a Canadian federal politician
 Mike Casselman (born 1968), a retired Canadian professional ice hockey player
 Orren D. Casselman (1861-1950), an Ontario merchant and political figure
 William Allen Casselman, a Canadian mathematician
 William Gordon Casselman (born 1942), a Canadian writer and broadcaster
 William H. Casselman (1868-1941), an Ontario farmer and political figure

Other
 Casselman Bridge, a historic bridge east of Grantsville, Maryland.
 Casselman railway station, a station stop in the village of Casselman, Ontario, Canada  
 Casselman Wind Power Project, a wind farm in Somerset County, Pennsylvania
 Ottawa/Casselman (Shea Field) Aerodrome, an aerodrome located east of Ottawa, Ontario, Canada.